Sergiu Juric (born 3 March 1984) is a Moldovan professional footballer who plays as a goalkeeper.

External links

Profile at FC SHERIFF

1984 births
Living people
Footballers from Chișinău
Moldovan footballers
Association football goalkeepers
Moldovan Super Liga players
FC Sheriff Tiraspol players
FC Tiraspol players
FC Iskra-Stal players
FC Veris Chișinău players
CSF Bălți players